El Soplón or Boy Blowing on an Ember is a 1571-1572 oil on canvas painting by El Greco, produced during his stay in Rome and inspired by a passage in Pliny the Elder's Naturalis historia. It and Portrait of Giulio Clovio are among the first of his paintings of figures. He later re-used the figure for The Fable (1580).

It may have been a direct commission from the Farnese family, though its origins are not known for sure. It is traditionally thought to have been influenced by Jacopo Bassano, though recent studies have shown that it was instead an attempt to reconstruct a lost ancient Roman painting. It formed part of the Farnese Collection. The painting was inherited by Charles of Bourbon in 1734 and moved to Naples. It is now in the Museo di Capodimonte in Naples.

Bibliography 
  J. Álvarez Lopera, El Greco, Madrid, Arlanza (2005), Biblioteca «Descubrir el Arte», (colección «Grandes maestros»). 
  M. Scholz-Hanzsel, El Greco, Colonia, Taschen (2003).

References

1570s paintings
Paintings by El Greco
Paintings in the collection of the Museo di Capodimonte
Farnese Collection